Ruchi Savarn is an Indian television actress. She is known for her performances in Ghar Aaja Pardesi, Kumkum Bhagya and Kundali Bhagya.

Personal life
Savarn married actor Ankit Mohan on 2 December 2015. They had their first child, a boy on 7 December 2021.

Career
Savarn began in television as an assistant director/producer before becoming an actor.

Her roles include Hindi ones in productions such as Zunj Marathmoli, Ghar Aaja Pardesi, Crime Patrol, Fear Files, Mejwani Pariporna Kitchen, Tere Liye as Janaki and in Pyaar Ka Bandhan with the role of Radha. In the Marathi TV serial, Sakhi, she acted the role of Revati while playing against the lead actor Digpal Lanjekar. She is also a trained dancer.

Filmography

Television

Films

References

External links
 

Living people
Indian television actresses
Actresses in Marathi television
Actresses in Hindi television
21st-century Indian actresses
Year of birth missing (living people)
Actors from Mumbai